FCL may refer to:

Computing 
 Flow chart language
 Framework Class Library, a .NET library
 Free Component Library, a Pascal library
 Fuzzy Control Language

Sport 
 1. FC Lichtenfels, a German football club
 FC Lorient, a French football club
 FC Luzern, a Swiss football club
 FC Lootos Põlva (women) or FCL Lootos, an Estonian football club
 Florida Complex League, a US-based rookie league in professional baseball

Transport 
 Ferrocarril de Langreo, a defunct Spanish railway
 Florida Coastal Airlines, a defunct American airline
 Flying Colours Airlines, a defunct British airline
 Full container load

Other uses 
 Christopher Columbus Foundation or Fondazione Cristoforo Colombo per le Libertà, a political party in Italy
 Faculdade Cásper Líbero, a Brazilian journalism school
 Fault current limiter
 Federated Co-operatives, a Canadian retail co-operative
 First Colony Life Insurance Company, a defunct American insurer
 FishCenter Live, an American television series
 Foundation Coal Holdings, an American coal mining company
 Free convective layer
 Fundação Cásper Líbero, Brazilian media company

See also
 JAR-FCL (Pilot License), Joint Aviation Requirements Flight Crew License